Oaken Wood is a  geological Site of Special Scientific Interest west of Maidstone in Kent. It is a Geological Conservation Review site.

Known locally as "Barming Wood" due to the village of Barming being the closest settlement to Oaken Woods, it is an ancient woodland with orchids, dormice, tawny owls, nightingales and many species of bat (alongside various other species). 

This site provides the best example of a very unusual topography, with cracking and tilting of underlying weaker strata during the Pleistocene by periglacial processes producing crests and troughs in the surface rocks.

A public footpath crosses the site.

In 2013, plans to uproot parts or all of Oaken Wood for a ragstone quarry were met with controversy due to its environmental importance (with various different species residing there) and its possibility in setting a legal precedent for up to 300 other ancient woodlands in the UK.

References

Sites of Special Scientific Interest in Kent
Geological Conservation Review sites
Forests and woodlands of Kent